Azygophleps cooksoni is a moth in the  family Cossidae. It is found in Natal Province, South Africa.

References

Endemic moths of South Africa
Moths described in 1968
Azygophleps
Moths of Africa
Taxa named by Elliot Pinhey